The following statistics encompass the 1991–92 Primera División de México season.

Overview
It was contested by 20 teams, and the León won the championship.

Atlante F.C. was promoted from Segunda División.

Starting in 1991–92, there was a change in the system of relegation to the Segunda División. The so-called "relegation table" was implemented, in which the points obtained in the last two seasons were divided between the games played in the current season to obtain a coefficient.

This is the relegation system used by Primera Div./Liga MX to this day. The difference is in that due to the change in the calendar which allowed for shorter tournaments, it encompasses the past five seasons (equivalent to about 2.5 years' worth of league games).

The club that was known at the time as Cobras de Ciudad Juárez was relegated to Segunda División, it was the first team relegated with the relegation table system.

Teams

Group stage

Group 1

Group 2

Group 3

Group 4

Results

Playoff

Repechaje round
América 2-0 ; 0-4 Cruz Azul
UAT 2-1 ; 1-4 Veracruz

Final

León won 2-0 on aggregate.

Relegation table

References
Mexico - List of final tables (RSSSF)

Liga MX seasons
1991–92 in Mexican football
Mex